Paris Métro Line 3bis (French: Ligne 3 bis du métro de Paris) is one of the sixteen lines of the Paris Métro. It connects Gambetta and Porte des Lilas in the 20th arrondissement in the east of Paris. It is also the least used line, with just over 1.6 million passengers in 2003, behind Line 7bis's 3.5 million.

The line was constructed during the 1910s as an extension to Line 3, but the two were disconnected in 1971. From then on Line 3bis was operated separately. At the same time Line 3 was extended to Gallieni. As of 2010, six MF 67 trains, each composed of three cars, run on the line.

History

Chronology
27 November 1921 – The section from Gambetta to Porte des Lilas on line 3, as well as a shuttle between Line 3 and Line 7, are opened.
3 September 1939 – The shuttle service is closed.
27 March 1971 – The Gambetta to Porte des Lilas section is disconnected from Line 3 and designated Line 3bis.

Metro Line 3

On 13 March 1903 the Council of Paris granted the Compagnie du chemin de fer métropolitain de Paris (CMP) the right to build a second east–west Métro line, in addition to Line 1. On 19 October 1904, the section of Line 3 running from Villiers to Père Lachaise was opened; the remainder of the line to Gambetta was opened on 25 January 1905.  The new line contained seventeen stations. A westward extension was progressively put into service, first to Pereire on 23 May 1910 and later to Porte de Champerret on 15 February 1911.

Expansion of Line 3
The Fulgence Bienvenüe project was presented on 4 December 1901, and proposed a number of new lines and expansions, including one to line 3 from Gambetta to the Romainville porte (Porte des Lilas).

A second loan of 179 million francs for the work was approved on 26 June 1903. On 28 December 1905, the Council of Paris awarded the expansion project to the CMP. The decision was formalized on 23 December 1907. Eventually, a third loan of 40 million francs was authorized on 10 April 1908, but this was not granted until April 1910 due to the associated déclaration d'utilité publique, a process required in France to demonstrate the public benefits of a proposed project.

The planned extension, which would connect to line 7 (now 7bis) at the station Pré-Saint-Gervais, stretched . It was constructed under the avenue Gambetta to Porte Lilas, where a turnaround loop was installed under the city walls. The terrain of the area, which was especially moist and unstable—due to the ancient Saint-Fargeau Lake—made construction difficult. As a result, the tunnel was built in a layer of gypsum, very deep underground; stations were contained in a reinforced vault, with elevators linking the platforms to the surface.  Beyond the Porte des Lilas, a double-track tunnel extended by two single-track tunnels—the voie des Fêtes (south tunnel) and the voie navette ("shuttle line", north tunnel) connected the extension to line 7—allowing the latter to be extended to Porte des Lilas in the future.

The work was nearly finished before the start of World War I, during which it ground to a halt. The project was returned to the CMP on 23 February 1920, but work did not resume immediately; the CMP waited for the city to provide the necessary funds that had been granted in the new 1920 convention. The final work was completed in December 1920.
Although originally planned, the plan for trains on line 7 to continue to Porte des Lilas was eventually abandoned, as trains on line 3 provided an adequate service on this branch (at the time, line 11 did not yet exist). Nevertheless, in order to connect lines 3 and 7, a shuttle was planned to run through the north connecting tunnel, later named la voie navette. The Sprague-Thomson variant of rolling stock serviced this tunnel, taken from line 2. This variant measured  in length and consisted of one train powered by two motors. With these changes, the voie des Fêtes and the Haxo station were left unused: the former serving as a train shed and the latter being left inaccessible to the public. The Gambetta – Porte des Lilas section and the shuttle were inaugurated on 27 November 1921.

The shuttle ceased operation on 3 September 1939 as part of the World War II service cutbacks.

Creation of Line 3 bis

During the 1960s, the public complained that public transport was inadequate in the Porte de Bagnolet area, despite great demand. It was therefore decided to extend Line 3 to Bagnolet (Gallieni) from Gambetta. As the passenger traffic to Bagnolet was expected to be much greater than that to Porte des Lilas, the construction of a fork was ruled out. Using Porte des Lilas as the terminus was abandoned in favor of creating a new terminus, and it was decided to construct a separate section of track running from Gambetta to Porte des Lilas, to be called line 3bis.

To accommodate these changes, Gambetta, which at the time consisted of only two half-stations, underwent major alteration. The southern half-station was demolished and the northern half-station was renovated to become the terminus of the new line 3bis, with two tracks on either side of a central platform. New tracks were constructed for line 3, and the station Martin Nadaud, which was only  from the old stations (under the square of the same name), was closed. The new platforms are on the site of this old station, in the direction of Pont de Levallois; this explains the longer-than-normal platforms at Gambetta.

Gambetta was opened on 23 August 1969, but line 3 bis did not open until 27 March 1971. The expansion to Bagnolet was opened on 2 April 1971. In 1970, line 3 bis was linked to a poste de commande centralisé (PCC), or central command post, along with line 3. Despite this, line 3 bis has not been equipped with driverless cars, as the small amount of traffic on the line did not justify the installation of such a system.

Route and stations

Route

Line 3bis is entirely underground.

The line begins at the Gambetta terminus with its two tracks joined by a central platform.  The line follows the avenue Gambetta in a north-easterly direction, following a nearly straight route to pass through the two deep stations of Pelleport and Saint-Fargeau, before reaching its terminus at Porte des Lilas.
The line ends with a turnaround loop, with one of the two tracks allowing for trains to be transferred to the voie navette.

List of stations

At the end of 2009 and beginning of 2010, the two bis lines were equipped with this system; on these lines, however, the system provides only the waiting time for the next incoming train (as opposed to the times for the next two incoming trains). The installation of this system in the two bis lines completed the system's deployment along Paris' transportation network.

Line 3bis contains the following stations, beginning with its southern terminus (connections with other lines are indicated by the presence of the connecting line's number):

(Stations in bold serve as the departure or terminus of the line)

Themed or otherwise unique stations

The architect Charles Plumet was charged with designing the outside entrances to the Pelleport, Saint-Fargeau, and Porte des Lilas stations.

Taking into consideration criticism of stations along other lines that required passengers to first descend to an area where tickets could be purchased, and then further descend to the platforms, Plumet designed the stations such that the elevators are accessible directly from the surface.  The three stations are made of reinforced concrete and ciment de Grenoble; they are decorated with ceramics made by Gentil & Bourdet.  The contractors of the station were Pinton and Nion Lacroix.

Connections

The line contains two connections with the rest of the network:
with line 3, at the northern side of the terminus Gambetta, on the tracks in the direction of Porte des Lilas;
with line 7bis, at the exit of the terminus Porte des Lilas, on the tracks in the direction of Gambetta.

The latter connection consists of the original two tracks that were originally intended to connect lines 3 and 7.

In the direction of lines 3 towards line 7, the tunnel "Voie navette" runs from Pré Saint-Gervais to Porte des Lilas.  A shuttle operated along these tracks until it was closed shortly before the start of World War II.

In the opposite direction, the tunnel "Voie des Fêtes", begins at the station Place des Fêtes, and ends at the station Haxo.  Haxo was never opened to the public, and entrances to it were never built.

These two sets of tracks reunite in Porte des Lilas, and are often used for filming movies.

Service depots
The rolling stock of line 3bis is kept along with that of line 3 at the depot at Saint-Fargeau, accessible at Gambetta station.

Repairs and regular maintenance (e.g. of batteries, electrical wiring, and paint) are carried out at the depot at Choisy, along with the rest of the Paris rail network. Opened in 1931, it is situated in the 13th arrondissement, close to the boulevard périphérique and accessible via a branch off line 7. The depot is split into two: one part maintains the line 7 (AMT) trains, and the other renovates all métro trains.

Operation

Service
In 2010, a complete trip along the line took only four minutes. As on the principal lines on the métro network, the first departures are at about 5:30 am (5:27 am from Porte des Lilas and 5:32 am from Gambetta); the last departures are at 1:04 am from Porte des Lilas and at 1:11 am from Gambetta, except on Friday and Saturday nights and holidays. Despite the light traffic on the line, the service interval is short: on average 3 to 5 minutes during the day and 8 to 9 minutes late at night; 6 to 8 minutes on Sunday mornings and about 10 minutes on Friday and Saturday nights (after 1:15 am) and holidays (after 12:30 am).

Rolling stock

Until 1971, the rolling stock on line 3bis was the same as on line 3. Between 1972 and July 1981, the Sprague-Thomson variant was used, but this was then replaced with MF 67trains of only three cars (because of the low passenger volumes), which still run on the line today. These trains are identical to those on line 9, except that the 3bis trains do not have strapontins (fold-down seats).

Employees
Employees on the network are divided into two categories: station agents and conductors.  Station agents are responsible for selling tickets, ensuring that passengers have not entered the métro illegally (i.e. preventing fare evasion), managing the stations, and ensuring the proper installation of instructional signs and other fixtures according to service needs.  Some agents are at times relieved from their normal duties so that they can operate the ticket booth.
Conductors, on the other hand, ensure the proper operation of the trains.  Service is broken down into three shifts: day, mixed, and night.

Fares and financing
Fares are identical to those on the rest of the metropolitan network; the line is accessible by the same transit subscriptions. A ticket t+ allows for a one-way trip on the line, regardless of the number of connections made with other métro lines or the RER (so long as the RER is taken only within the city of Paris, meaning Paris intra-muros).

The financing of the operation of the line is guaranteed by the RATP. Fares and subscription prices are regulated by the government and in fact their revenues do not cover the entire operating costs of the network. The difference is made up with funding provided by Île-de-France Mobilités (IDFM), presided over since 2005 by the President of the Regional Council of Île-de-France and governed by locally elected officials. The organisation defines the general conditions of operation including the duration and frequency of services. The operational budget is guaranteed by an annual subsidy provided to the general transportation network of the region; this subsidy is funded by a tax (the versement transport (VT), which is imposed on all companies in the region that employ more than nine people, as well as other public funds.

Traffic
The traffic along line 3bis is included with the statistics of line 3, which are presented below:

Projects

The proposed merger of lines 3bis and Paris Métro Line 7bis was postponed indefinitely in March 2013. In October 2013 it was rescheduled in principle for 2030. Such a merger might involve the reopening of the Voie des Fêtes and the Voie navette, eventually allowing for the opening of the ghost station Haxo.

Tourism
Line 3bis serves only four stations in the 20th arrondissement of Paris and does not serve any areas frequented by tourists; thus the line is little-known except to locals. The line's almost bizarre atmosphere (similar to that of line 7bis) is a great contrast to the popular lines 1, 4, and 13: the trains carry few passengers and the stations are nearly deserted.

Appendix

See also

Bibliography

Notes and references

External links

  RATP official website
  RATP english speaking website
  Interactive Map of the RER (from RATP's website)
  Interactive Map of the Paris métro (from RATP's website)
  Mobidf website, dedicated to the RER (unofficial)
  Metro-Pole website, dedicated to Paris public transports (unofficial)

 
Railway lines opened in 1971
Articles containing video clips